Bennett Creek may refer to:

Bennett Creek (Missouri), a stream in Missouri
Bennett Creek (Nansemond River tributary), a stream in Virginia
Bennett Creek (New Mexico), a stream in New Mexico

See also
Bennetts River, Arkansas and Missouri